In mathematical analysis, semicontinuity (or semi-continuity) is a property of extended real-valued functions that is weaker than continuity. An extended real-valued function  is upper (respectively, lower) semicontinuous at a point  if, roughly speaking, the function values for arguments near  are not much higher (respectively, lower) than  

A function is continuous if and only if it is both upper  and lower semicontinuous.

 

The notion of upper and lower semicontinuous function was first introduced and studied by René Baire in his thesis in 1899.

Definitions 

Upper semicontinuity 

A function  is called upper semicontinuous at a point  if for every real  there exists a neighborhood  of  such that  for all .
Equivalently,  is upper semicontinuous at  if and only if

where lim sup is the limit superior of the function  at the point .

A function  is called upper semicontinuous if it satisfies any of the following equivalent conditions:
(1) The function is upper semicontinuous at every point of its domain.
(5) The function is continuous when the codomain  is given the left order topology.  This is just a restatement of condition (2) since the left order topology is generated by all the intervals .

Lower semicontinuity 

A function  is called lower semicontinuous at a point  if for every real  there exists a neighborhood  of  such that  for all .
Equivalently,  is lower semicontinuous at  if and only if

where  is the limit inferior of the function  at point .

A function  is called lower semicontinuous if it satisfies any of the following equivalent conditions:
(1) The function is lower semicontinuous at every point of its domain.
(5) The function is continuous when the codomain  is given the right order topology.  This is just a restatement of condition (2) since the right order topology is generated by all the intervals .

Examples 
Consider the function  piecewise defined by:

This function is upper semicontinuous at  but not lower semicontinuous.

The floor function  which returns the greatest integer less than or equal to a given real number  is everywhere upper semicontinuous. Similarly, the ceiling function  is lower semicontinuous.

Upper and lower semicontinuity bear no relation to continuity from the left or from the right for functions of a real variable. Semicontinuity is defined in terms of an ordering in the range of the functions, not in the domain.  For example the function

is upper semicontinuous at  while the function limits from the left or right at zero do not even exist.

As an example, consider approximating the unit square diagonal by a staircase from below. The staircase always has length 2, while the diagonal line has only length .

Let  be a measure space and let  denote the set of positive measurable functions endowed with the

Properties 

Unless specified otherwise, all functions below are from a topological space  to the extended real numbers  Several of the results hold for semicontinuity at a specific point, but for brevity they are only stated from semicontinuity over the whole domain.

 A function  is continuous if and only if it is both upper and lower semicontinuous.

 The indicator function of a set  (defined by  if  and  if ) is upper semicontinuous if and only if  is a closed set.  It is lower semicontinuous if and only if  is an open set.

 The sum  of two lower semicontinuous functions is lower semicontinuous (provided the sum is well-defined, i.e.,  is not the indeterminate form ).  The same holds for upper semicontinuous functions.

 If both functions are non-negative, the product function  of two lower semicontinuous functions is lower semicontinuous.  The corresponding result holds for upper semicontinuous functions.

 A function  is lower semicontinuous if and only if  is upper semicontinuous.

 The composition  of upper semicontinuous functions is not necessarily upper semicontinuous, but if  is also non-decreasing, then  is upper semicontinuous.

 The minimum and the maximum of two lower semicontinuous functions are lower semicontinuous. The same holds for upper semicontinuous functions.

 The (pointwise) supremum of an arbitrary family  of lower semicontinuous functions  (defined by ) is lower semicontinuous.

In particular, the limit of a monotone increasing sequence  of continuous functions is lower semicontinuous. (The Theorem of Baire below provides a partial converse.) The limit function will only be lower semicontinuous in general, not continuous.

Likewise, the infimum of an arbitrary family of upper semicontinuous functions is upper semicontinuous.  And the limit of a monotone decreasing sequence of continuous functions is upper semicontinuous.

 (Theorem of Baire)  Assume  is a metric space.

(Proof for the upper semicontinuous case: By condition (5) in the definition,  is continuous when  is given the left order topology.  So its image  is compact in that topology.  And the compact sets in that topology are exactly the sets with a maximum.  For an alternative proof, see the article on the extreme value theorem.)

 Any upper semicontinuous function  on an arbitrary topological space  is locally constant on some dense open subset of 

 Tonelli's theorem in functional analysis characterizes the weak lower semicontinuity of nonlinear functionals on Lp spaces in terms of the convexity of another function.

See also

Notes

References

Bibliography

 
 
 
 
 
 

 
  

Theory of continuous functions
Mathematical analysis
Variational analysis